Monacrosporium is a genus of fungi in the family Orbiliaceae. There are 53 species.

Species
Monacrosporium ambrosium Gadd & Loos 1947
Monacrosporium aphrobrochum (Drechsler) Subram. 1964
Monacrosporium appendiculatum (Mekht.) Xing Z. Liu & K.Q. Zhang 1994
Monacrosporium asthenopagum (Drechsler) A. Rubner 1996
Monacrosporium bembicodes (Drechsler) Subram. 1964
Monacrosporium carestianum Ferraris 1904
Monacrosporium chiuanum Xing Z. Liu & K.Q. Zhang 1994
Monacrosporium coelobrochum (Drechsler) Subram. 1964
Monacrosporium cystosporum R.C. Cooke & C.H. Dickinson 1965
Monacrosporium deodycoides (Drechsler) R.C. Cooke & C.H. Dickinson 1965
Monacrosporium drechsleri (Tarjan) R.C. Cooke & C.H. Dickinson 1965
Monacrosporium ellipsosporum (Preuss) R.C. Cooke & C.H. Dickinson 1965
Monacrosporium eudermatum (Drechsler) Subram. 1964
Monacrosporium fusiforme R.C. Cooke & C.H. Dickinson 1963
Monacrosporium globosporum Preuss 1967
Monacrosporium guizhouense K.Q. Zhang, Xing Z. Liu & L. Cao 1996
Monacrosporium haptotylum (Drechsler) Xing Z. Liu & K.Q. Zhang 1994
Monacrosporium heterosporum (Drechsler) Subram. 1964
Monacrosporium horrida Dudd.
Monacrosporium indicum (Chowdhry & Bahl) Xing Z. Liu & K.Q. Zhang 1994
Monacrosporium inquisitor Xing Z. Liu & K.Q. Zhang 1994
Monacrosporium iridis (Ts. Watan.) A. Rubner & W. Gams 1996
Monacrosporium janus S.D. Li & Xing Z. Liu 2003
Monacrosporium leporinum Bubák 1906
Monacrosporium leptosporum (Drechsler) A. Rubner 1996
Monacrosporium longiphorum Xing Z. Liu & B.S. Lu 1993
Monacrosporium megalosporum (Drechsler) Subram. 1964
Monacrosporium megasporum Boedijn 1929
Monacrosporium microscaphoides Xing Z. Liu & B.S. Lu 1993
Monacrosporium multiforme (Dowsett, J. Reid & Kalkat) A. Rubner 1996
Monacrosporium multiseptatum H.Y. Su & K.Q. Zhang 2005
Monacrosporium mutabile R.C. Cooke 1969
Monacrosporium obtrulloides Castaner 1968
Monacrosporium ovatum Petch 1922
Monacrosporium polybrochum (Drechsler) Subram. 1977
Monacrosporium psychrophilum Drechsler) R.C. Cooke & C.H. Dickinson 1965
Monacrosporium reticulatum (Peach) R.C. Cooke & C.H. Dickinson 1965
Monacrosporium rutgeriense R.C. Cooke & Pramer 1968
Monacrosporium salinum R.C. Cooke & C.H. Dickinson 1965
Monacrosporium sarcopodioides (Harz) Berl. & Voglino 1886
Monacrosporium sclerohypha (Drechsler) Xing Z. Liu & K.Q. Zhang 1994
Monacrosporium sinense Xing Z. Liu & K.Q. Zhang 1994
Monacrosporium sphaeroides Castaner 1968
Monacrosporium stenobrochum Drechsler) Subram. 1964
Monacrosporium subtile Oudem. 1885
Monacrosporium synnematum Matsush. 1995
Monacrosporium tedeschii A. Agostini 1933
Monacrosporium tentaculatum A. Rubner & W. Gams 1996
Monacrosporium thaumasium (Drechsler) de Hoog & Oorschot 1985
Monacrosporium turkmenicum (Soprunov) R.C. Cooke & C.H. Dickinson 1965
Monacrosporium ullum D.G. Kim, Ryu & H.G. Hwang 2006
Monacrosporium yunnanense K.Q. Zhang, Xing Z. Liu & L. Cao 1996
Monacrosporium ziziphi Bacc. 1917

References
Index Fungorum Home Page

Helotiales
Helotiales genera